The 2019 Reigate and Banstead Borough Council election took place on 2 May 2019 to elect members to Reigate and Banstead Borough Council in England. It coincided with other local elections. Due to ward boundary changes, the entire council was up for election for the seats in the all new wards. Each ward is a three member ward. These were the first boundary changes since 2000.

Results summary

Ward results

Banstead Village

Chipstead, Kingswood and Woodmansterne

Earlswood and Whitebushes

Hooley, Merstham and Netherne

Horley Central and South

Horley East and Salfords

Horley West and Sidlow

Lower Kingswood, Tadworth and Walton

Meadvale and St. John's

Nork

Redhill East

Redhill West and Wray Common

Reigate

South Park and Woodhatch

Tattenham Corner and Preston

References

2019 English local elections
May 2019 events in the United Kingdom
2019
2010s in Surrey